Buzurg Ibn Shahriyar of Ramhormuz (full name ), was allegedly a Muslim traveler, sailor, cartographer and geographer who was born in Khuzistan in Persia. In the year 953 he supposedly completed a collection of narratives from Muslim sailors based in Siraf, Oman, Basra and elsewhere.

In this work, there are mentions of how Muslim seafarers traveled to India, Malaysia, Indonesia, China and East Africa. Various links are mentioned between the Abbasid Caliphate and Tang dynasty, China.

However, it is now believed that Buzurg is probably a purely fictional personage. Apart from the attribution of this book to him, his existence is otherwise unattested. The attribution apparently dates from the thirteenth century, long after he allegedly lived. Recent research has shown that the book was more probably written in Cairo during the second half of the tenth century, by a scholar called Abū ‘Imrān Mūsā ibn Rabāḥ al-Awsī al-Sīrāfī.

Narrative

Conversion of the Raja of Ra
According to  the narrative of Abu Muhammad al-Hassan Hammawiyah al-Najiramy, a Raja of India named Mahruk son of Raiq of Ra lived in a country between upper and lower Kashmir requested a copy of the Quran from the Muslim Amir of Mansura (Brahmanabad), Abdullah ibn Umar ibn Abd al-Aziz. The ruler had secretly converted to Islam and requested the Muslim envoy to stay in his court for 3 years and paid 600 mann of Gold on three occasions.

Andaman Islands
The Persian navigator Al-Ramhormuzi, in his 10th century book Ajaib al-Hind (The wonders of India) described the islands as being inhabited by fierce cannibalistic tribes. The book also mentions an island he called Andaman al-Kabir (Great Andaman).

References

10th-century Iranian geographers